Clara Edwards (April 17, 1880 – January 17, 1974) was an American singer, pianist, and composer of art songs. She also used the pseudonym Bernard Haigh.

Biography
She was born Clara Gerlich in Decoria Township, Blue Earth County, Minnesota. She received her education from the Mankato State Normal School and the Cosmopolitan School of Music in Chicago. She married physician John Milton Edwards before finishing her degree, and the couple moved to Vienna, where she continued musical studies and had a daughter. In Europe she prepared for a career as a singer, and gave concerts in both the United States and Europe before moving to New York City in 1914.  Two years later her husband died, leaving her a single mother in New York city with no steady income.

Out of financial necessity, Edwards began her career as a composer and songwriter in the 1920s, joining the American Society of Composers, Authors and Publishers (ASCAP) in 1925. She toured in Vaudeville at about the same time, and organized the Chautauqua Concert Company in 1934. She often collaborated with Jack Lawrence, but also wrote many of the lyrics to her own songs.

Music
Edwards composed over 100 works and published over 60 songs. Several of her songs are sacred, and she wrote choral arrangements for some of them.  She also composed music for solo piano, for children's marionette plays and animated films.  Her songs have been recorded and issued on CD and used in film soundtracks and animations.

Her songs were "quickly taken up by publishers", and many famous singers performed them, including soprano Lily Pons and baritones John Charles Thomas and Ezio Pinza.  They also became more successful when performed on the popular radio show The Bell Telephone Hour. They are "distinguished for their tasteful and truly lovely melodies" and considered some of the "best of the ballad style concert song[s]". They "successfully blended the styles of art song and the sentimental popular ballad".

Perhaps her most successful song was "With the Wind and the Rain in Your Hair", with text by Jack Lawrence.  First published in 1930, it became a hit a decade later. Two of her other well-known songs are "By the Bend of the River" and "Into the Night"; the latter is frequently used by voice teachers as a training piece, and is included in several song anthologies. She died in New York City.

Published songs

published by G. Schirmer unless noted

After (A Song of Contrasts), 1927
All Thine Own, Carl Fischer, 1935
At Twilight, 1944
At Your Window, 1951
Awake! Arise! (a Song for Easter), Oliver Ditson, 1927
Awake, Beloved!, 1925
A Benediction, 1927
Birds (text by Moira O'Neill), 1958
Bring Back the Days, Oliver Ditson, 1945
By the Bend of the River, 1927
Can this be Summer? (A Song of Longing), 1926
Clementine, 1927
Come, Love, the Long Day Closes (A Song of Devotion), 1928
Cradle Song
The Day's Begun, 1930
Dedication (Sacred Song), 1961
Dusk at Sea (text by Thomas S. Jones), Jack Mills Inc., 1923
The Eastern Heavens are all aglow (Christmas Song), 1927
Evening Song, 1934
Every One Sang (A song of exultation) (text by S. Sassoon), 1921
Fear Ye Not, O Israel (Sacred Song), 1942
The Fisher's Widow (text by Arthur Symons), 1929
Forward We March, Galaxy Music Corp., 1940
Gipsy Life, 1932
I Bring you lilies from my Garden, Oliver Ditson, 1927
I Dream of You, 1952
In the Moonlight, 1951
Into the Night (text by the composer), 1939
I've Lived and Loved, Unknown publisher, 1941
Joy (text by T. Hollingsworth), 1943
Lady Moon (text by Thekla Hollingsworth), Oliver Ditson, 1927
Little Shepherd's Song (13th Century melody) (text by William Alexander Percy), Jack Mills Inc., 1952
Lonesome (text by N. R. Eberhart), 1926
The Lord is Exalted (Sacred), 1940
Love Came to Me
A Love Song, Oliver Ditson, 1945
Morning Serenade (A Reveille) (text by Madison Julius Cawein), 1928
My Homeland, 1934
My Little Brown Nest by the Sea (text by T. Hollingsworth), Jack Mills Inc., 1923
My Shrine (Wedding Song), 1948
O Come to Me
O Magic Night of Love, 1927
Ol' Jim, 1952
Out of the Dusk (A Reverie), 1927
A Prayer (Sacred), 1932
The Snow, 1962
Sometimes at Close of Day (A Pensive Song), 1925
Song of my Soul
Song of the Brooklet (text by V. McDonald), 1932
Spain (España), 1929
Stars of the Night, Sing Softly (text by T. Hollingsworth), 1929
'Tis Enough (text by Kenneth Rand), Jack Mills Inc., 1923
To a Little Child, 1954
To Stars and You
To Thee, Divine Reedemer, 1948
The Twenty-Seventh Psalm (The Lord is My Light), 1938
We Walked in the Garden, 1939
When I am Gone, Beloved
When I Behold, 1929
When Jesus Walked on Galilee (Sacred), 1928
When the Sun Calls the Lark, Oliver Ditson, 1929
When You Stand by your Window, 1944
The Wild Rose Blooms, 1940
With the Wind and the Rain in Your Hair (text by Jack Lawrence), 1930, reissued Paramount Music Corp., 1940
A Yesterday
Your Picture, Chappell Music, 1952

Published piano solos
published by G. Schirmer unless noted
By the Bend of the River (Barcarolle), arr. by Carl Deis
Cloud Ways
Nodding Flowers
The Rocking Chair
The Swing
The Waves

Published choral arrangements
published by G. Schirmer unless noted
Awake! Arise! (Easter Anthem) (arr. by William Stickles), mixed voices, 1958
By the Bend of the River, multiple arrangements
Clementine, women's voices
Come, Love, the Long Day Closes, men's voices
Dedication (text by John Oxenham), mixed voices, 1960
The Eastern Heaves are all Aglow (arr. by William Stickles), mixed voices, 1962
The Herder's Song, women's voices, 1946
Into the Night, multiple arrangements
I Will Lift Mine Eyes, mixed voices
The Lord is My Light, mixed voices, 1940
A Prayer, mixed voiced
Sometimes at Close of Day, men's voices
A Song of Joy, women's voices
Song of the Brooklet, women's voices
The Twenty-Seventh Psalm, mixed voices
When I Behold, mixed voices
When Jesus Walked on Galilee (arr. Carl Deis), mixed voices, 1951

Footnotes

References
.
.

1880 births
1974 deaths
20th-century classical composers
American women classical composers
American classical composers
People from Mankato, Minnesota
20th-century American women musicians
20th-century American composers
20th-century women composers